"Terminal 3" was the  entry in the Eurovision Song Contest 1984, performed in English by Linda Martin.

The result of this song is thus part of Logan's positioning as the most successful contest entrant in history.

The song itself is a moderately up-tempo number, with Martin singing about her feelings while waiting for her lover to disembark from a flight from the United States. She sings that her own feelings for him have not changed and that she hopes that the same is true of him, although "he's been away too long now". The central motif of the song is the line "Terminal Three: flight's on time", and Logan has stated he was inspired to write the song while waiting in Heathrow Airport's Terminal 3 for a flight home.

The original promotional video features Martin travelling to, and eventually (in an inset) meeting her lover at Dublin Airport, which was a single terminal airport at the time and still does not have a Terminal 3.

Before the contest, the song had been considered one of the favourites to win and had attracted attention from the media. The song was performed ninth on the night, following 's Jacques Zegers with "Avanti la vie" and preceding 's Hot Eyes with "Det' lige det". At the close of voting, it had received 137 points, placing 2nd in a field of 19.

It was succeeded as Irish representative at the 1985 contest by Maria Christian with "Wait Until The Weekend Comes".

Charts

References 

Eurovision songs of 1984
Eurovision songs of Ireland
Linda Martin songs
Songs written by Johnny Logan (singer)